The European Cup is the former name of the UEFA Champions League, an annual continental club football competition organised by the Union of European Football Associations.

European Cup or Europe Cup may also refer to:

Football and rugby
 UEFA European Championship, originally called the UEFA European Nations Cup, football competition held every four years since 1960
 UEFA Cup Winners' Cup, a football club competition
 European Champion Clubs' Cup, football trophy given to the football club that wins the UEFA Champions League
 European Rugby Champions Cup, rugby union competition
 European Rugby Cup, organisers of the above-mentioned rugby union competition from 1995 to 2014
 Rugby League European Championship, held since 1935
 UEFA Women's Champions League, originally called the UEFA Women's Cup, a women's football club competition

Other
 European Cup (athletics), an annual national team competition held from 1965 to 2008
 European Champion Clubs Cup (athletics), an annual national club-team competition
 European Touring Car Cup, auto racing, held annually since 2005
 FIA European Formula Three Cup, auto racing, 1985–1990 and 1999–2002
 Europe Cup (badminton), an annual club competition held from 1978
 European Cup (bandy), an annual club competition first held in 1974
 European Cup (baseball), an annual club competition held from 1963
 European Cup (basketball)
 FIBA European Champions Cup, former name for Euroleague Basketball
 European Chess Club Cup
 European Nations Cup (field hockey)
 European Nations Cup (golf)
 UEG European Cup in Gymnastics, gymnastics
 EHF Champions League, handball, known as the European Cup competition from 1956 to 1993
 EHF European Cup, handball
 European Cup (ice hockey)
 European Cup (ice hockey), International Ice Hockey Federation, 1965–1997
 European Marathon Cup, running
 European Ultramarathon Cup, run annually since 1993
 European Champions League (table tennis)
 European Club Cup of Champions, table tennis club competition, defunct
 CEV Champions League in volleyball, known as the European Cup competition from 1959 to 2000
 European Race Walking Cup, walking, established in 1996

See also 
 EuroCup (disambiguation)
 Europa Cup (disambiguation)
 European Nations' Cup (disambiguation)
 European Champions Cup (disambiguation)